Johanna Cox-Ladru (born 8 March 1923, date of death unknown) was a Dutch gymnast. She competed at the 1952 Olympics in all artistic gymnastics events with the best result of 6th place in the team portable apparatus. Cox-Ladru is deceased.

References

External links
 

1923 births
Year of death missing
Dutch female artistic gymnasts
Gymnasts at the 1952 Summer Olympics
Olympic gymnasts of the Netherlands
Gymnasts from Amsterdam